The RSV Lahn-Dill (shortened: Wheelchair sport association Lahn-Dill, in German: Rollstuhl Sport Verein Lahn-Dill) is an association for wheelchair basketball in Wetzlar. The Association was founded in 1983. 

The Association counts to the most successful clubs in Germany, with fourteen German titles of championship. In the last years it was one of the most successful clubs worldwide. Lahn-Dill participated in all three European competitions and won the Willi-Brinkmann-Cup finals 2002 in Łódź. The club won the IWBF Champions Cup three times in a row between 2004 and 2006, being the first German team ever to win the Champions Cup.

External links
 RSV Lahn-Dill (english)

RSV
Sport in Wetzlar